Sullivant Township is one of twelve townships in Ford County, Illinois, USA.  As of the 2010 census, its population was 510 and it contained 238 housing units.

History
The township was formed from Dix Township on September 9, 1867.  It is named for Michael L. Sullivant, who in the 1860s was reputedly "the world's most successful farmer."  Sullivant owned  in Champaign, Ford, Piatt, and Livingston counties and used his land to raise corn and to graze large herds of cattle; he was one of a select group of wealthy men who dominated the state's booming livestock industry in the middle to late 19th century. An 1876 map of Ford County by Warner and Beers of the Union Atlas Co. shows Sullivant owning  in Ford County, including all of Sullivant Township.

Geography
The township is the headwaters of four major Illinois rivers - Sangamon, Mackinaw, Vermillion North, and Vermillion South.

Cities, towns, villages
 Sibley

Cemeteries
The township contains Mount Hope Cemetery.

Major highways
  Illinois Route 47

Demographics

School districts
 Gibson City-Melvin-Sibley Community Unit School District 5
 Prairie Central Community Unit School District 8

Political districts
 Illinois' 16th congressional district
 State House District 105
 State Senate District 53

References
 
 United States Census Bureau 2007 TIGER/Line Shapefiles
 United States National Atlas

External links
 City-Data.com
 Illinois State Archives

Townships in Ford County, Illinois
Townships in Illinois